Alan Soñora (born August 3, 1998) is an American professional soccer player who plays as an attacking midfielder for Liga MX club Juárez and the United States national team.

Club career
Born in the United States, Soñora played for Boca Juniors and Independiente at youth level. He was moved into Independiente's senior set-up in 2019–20, with manager Sebastián Beccacece selecting him on the bench five times across the Primera División and Copa Sudamericana in the early months of the campaign. Soñora's professional debut arrived on September 26, 2019, as he came off the substitutes bench to replace Silvio Romero after sixty-six minutes of a Copa Argentina victory over Defensa y Justicia.

International career
Soñora is eligible for Argentina and the United States at international level, and has expressed an interest in appearing for the latter alongside his brother Joel.

Personal life
Soñora's brother, Joel, is also a professional soccer player. They are the sons of Diego Soñora, who was playing in Major League Soccer at the time of their respective births.

Career statistics

Club

International

References

External links

1998 births
Living people
Soccer players from New Jersey
American soccer players
American people of Argentine descent
Association football midfielders
American expatriate soccer players
Argentine Primera División players
Club Atlético Independiente footballers
United States men's international soccer players
FC Juárez footballers